Derek Nathanial Luke (born April 24, 1974) is an American actor. He won the Independent Spirit Award for his big-screen debut performance as the titular character in the 2002 film Antwone Fisher, directed and produced by Denzel Washington. Luke is also known for his roles as Boobie Miles in Friday Night Lights (2004), Bobby Joe Hill in Glory Road (2006), Joshua Hardaway in Madea Goes to Jail (2009), Gabe Jones in Captain America: The First Avenger (2011), William Wright in Baggage Claim (2013), and as Kevin Porter on the Netflix original series 13 Reasons Why (2017–2020).

Early life
Luke was born in Jersey City, New Jersey, the son of Marjorie Dixon, a pianist, and Maurice Luke, a former actor. His father is from Georgetown, Guyana. He attended Henry Snyder High School and graduated from Linden High School.

Career

Luke played one of the four male leads in Spike Lee's 2008 war film Miracle at St. Anna, replacing Wesley Snipes, who had to leave the film due to his highly publicized tax problems.

Luke played a small role as a nurse in the 1999 episode "White Collar" of the sitcom The King of Queens, and appeared on the NBC show Trauma. He played one of the group members of Mayhem in the Moesha episode "Mayhem at the Jam Esp" (March 19, 2001).

Luke played alongside American actor Laurence Fishburne as Kid in the 2003 film Biker Boyz. He plays Alicia Keys' love interest in her music video for "Teenage Love Affair". He played singer Monica's love interest in her music video for "So Gone". Luke played Sean 'Puffy' Combs in the 2009 film Notorious, and James 'Boobie' Miles in the 2004 film Friday Night Lights.

Luke was cast to play Bobby Joe in the 2006 film Glory Road.

Luke played Gabe Jones, a member of the Howling Commandos, in the 2011 film Captain America: The First Avenger. In June 2011, Luke also began starring in the TNT original medical drama series Hawthorne as Miles Bourdet, an assistant surgeon from Chicago.

From February to April 2013, Luke played the character of Gregory in the FX series The Americans. In 2015, he played Malcolm Devoe, head of security for Empire Entertainment and Cookie's secret love interest, on the TV series Empire. In March 2018, he was cast in the lead role of the NBC pilot Suspicion.

Personal life
Since 1998, Luke has been married to actress Sophia Adella Luke. They have a son together.

Filmography

Film

Television

References

External links
 
 Interview, 1/12/06, LIFETEEN.com

1974 births
Living people
20th-century American male actors
21st-century American male actors
African-American male actors
American male film actors
American male television actors
American people of Guyanese descent
Henry Snyder High School alumni
Independent Spirit Award for Best Male Lead winners
Linden High School (New Jersey) alumni
People from Linden, New Jersey
Male actors from Jersey City, New Jersey
20th-century African-American people
21st-century African-American people